Roger Federer was the defending champion, and won in the final 6–0, 6–3, against Mardy Fish. He did not lose a single set in the entire tournament.

Seeds
A champion seed is indicated in bold text while text in italics indicates the round in which that seed was eliminated.

Draw

Finals

Top half

Bottom half

References

External links
Singles Draw
Qualifying Draw

2004 Gerry Weber Open